Chartered Semiconductor Manufacturing, Inc. (CSM), was a Singaporean semiconductor company.

History 
It was founded in 1987, as a venture that included Singapore Technologies Engineering Ltd. In 2000 ST Engineering (Singapore Technologies Semiconductors), a subsidiary of Temasek Holdings acquired Chartered.

Chartered Semiconductor Manufacturing was the world's third largest dedicated independent semiconductor foundry, with its headquarters and main operations located in the Woodlands Industrial Park, Kranji Singapore. The company was listed on the Singapore Exchange under the trading symbol of CHARTERED, as well as on NASDAQ (CHRT).

In September 2009, it was announced that Chartered Semiconductor was to be acquired by the main stockholder of GlobalFoundries, a joint venture between AMD and Advanced Technology Investment Company (ATIC), of Abu Dhabi, United Arab Emirates.  The transaction was completed at the end of 2009.

By acquiring Chartered, ATIC expanded its investments and expertise in technology in the semiconductor industry.

Fabrication facilities
Chartered provides comprehensive wafer fabrication services and technologies to semiconductor suppliers and systems companies. Chartered's customer base is primarily high-growth, technologically advanced companies operating in the communication, computer and consumer sectors. It does not provide design services and works from customers' designs to produce communications chips.

Besides its own fabs, Chartered operates joint venture facilities with other firms, it offers chip assembly and test services through sister firm STATS ChipPAC. Chartered owns 6 fabrication facilities, all of which are located in Singapore, including the newest, Chartered's first 300-mm facility which started commercial shipment in June 2005.

The other major semiconductor foundries include TSMC and UMC, Taiwanese-based companies, which are primarily Chartered's main competitors.

In 2006, AMD announced that it will manufacture CPUs with Chartered on a 65 nanometer process. It also has alliances with IBM, Infineon, Samsung and Agere Systems.

References

External links
 Press release of the acquisition

Companies formerly listed on the Singapore Exchange
Defunct semiconductor companies
Semiconductor companies of Singapore
Temasek Holdings
GlobalFoundries
Defunct companies of Singapore